Yurovo is a rural locality (a village) and the administrative center of Yurovskoye Rural Settlement, Gryazovetsky District, Vologda Oblast, Russia. The population was 762 as of 2002. There are 7 streets.

Geography 
Yurovo is located 21 km northwest of Gryazovets (the district's administrative centre) by road. Krivodino is the nearest rural locality.

References 

Rural localities in Gryazovetsky District